Manuel Vargas may refer to:

Manuel Vargas (footballer) (born 1991), Panamanian footballer
 Manuel Vargas (boxer) (born 1981), professional boxer
 Manuel Vargas (singer), lead member of the Mariachi Sangre Mexicana
 Manuel Cepeda Vargas (1930–1994), lawyer and Senator of Colombia